Un Gancho Al Corazón (English title: A Blow to the Heart) is a Mexican telenovela produced by Angelli Nesma Medina for Televisa that aired from August 25, 2008, to June 26, 2009. It is based on the Argentine telenovela Sos mi vida. In the United States the telenovela aired on Univision from June 22, 2009, to May 3, 2010. Un gancho al corazón came out on DVD on October 5, 2010.

Danna García and Sebastián Rulli star in the lead roles, while Laisha Wilkins, Roberto Blandón, Agustín Arana and Macaria starred as antagonists. Raúl Araiza, Margarita Magaña and Ana Martin starred as stellar performances.

Plot
Valentina López is a young professional boxer known as "La Monita". Roberto "Beto" Ochoa is her trainer and boyfriend, who puts her under pressure to train and win so he can get money for himself and his mother, Nieves. Nieves raised "Monita" because her own mother, Isabel, abandoned her.

In another place within the city is an enterprise called Sermeño Group, a realty enterprise owned by Mauricio Sermeño, an ex-car racer who wants to retire and have a family. Mauricio is engaged to Constanza, a selfish and rude woman. Mauricio is convinced that Constanza is the love of his life, even though her foul attitude and bad manners bother him. After a hand injury, "Monita" decides to find a different job in order to sustain her lazy boyfriend and her "mother-in-law".  With the help of her best friends Estrella and Paula, she goes to an interview at Sermeño Group, and after an eventful day, is hired as a secretary. Mauricio is convinced that "Monita" is honest and warm hearted and is attracted to her personality. With each day they spend together, they begin to fall in love, but because they are both in relationships, they hide their feelings in order to not hurt their significant others, unaware of their actions and unequal disregard for their feelings.

Mauricio is sure he wants to have a family, so he adopts three orphans named Aldo, Luisa, and Danny. Mauricio's cousin, Jeronimo, and Constanza disapprove of his decision. They try to make Mauricio change his mind but he is adamant he wants the kids in his life and says he will not abandon them. The children like "Monita" because she is kind to them and treats them as if they were her own children. They all quickly establish a close friendship and this captivates Mauricio, seeing Valentina as a potential partner. Unlike Valentina, Constanza hates the children, and since she is not kind, the kids reciprocate her feelings toward them. Constanza, Jeronimo, and Óscar, an unloyal employee of Sermeño Group, join forces to split Mauricio, "Monita", and the kids apart.

Even though Valentina and Mauricio fall in love with each other, they do not act on their feelings. Beto starts to fight in lucha libre as "El Fantasma Vengador" in order to bring in income so that Valentina feels better about him. He and Constanza meet and have sex, later trying to keep it a secret from their significant others, especially after they realize that Mauricio and Valentina are in love with each other. They will do anything to keep them apart.

Cast

Main
 Danna García as Valentina López "La Monita"
 Sebastián Rulli as Mauricio Sermeño
 Raúl Araiza as Roberto "Beto" Ochoa
 Ana Martín as Nieves Ochoa
 Otto Sirgo as Salvador Ulloa
 Eugenia Cauduro as Gabriela "Gaby" Palacios
 Laisha Wilkins as Constanza "Conny" Lerdo de Tejada Moncada / "La Momia"
 Úrsula Prats as Jacqueline Moncada
 Eric del Castillo as Marcos Lerdo de Tejada

Also main

 Roberto Blandón as Óscar Cárdenas Villavicencio
 Agustín Arana as Jeronimo Sermeño
 Verónica Jaspeado as Ximena Sermeño de Klunder
 Alex Sirvent as Rolando Klunder
 Lorena Enríquez as Paula Méndez
 Pablo Valentín as Tano
 Irma Lozano as Teresa García
 Raúl Padilla "Chóforo" as Don César
 Raquel Pankowsky as Bernarda
 Susana Lozano as Lorenza de Ulloa
 Ricardo Fastlicht as Lic. Marcos Bonilla
 Alejandro de la Madrid as Ricardo
 Carlos Ignacio as Mario
 Edgardo Eliezer as El Costeño
 Manuel Ojeda as Don Hilario Ochoa
 Margarita Magaña as Estrella Falcón
 Raquel Morell as Gertrudis
 Vilmatraca as Dorita
 Malillany Marín as Anastasia
 Luis Gatica as El Colmillos
 José Luis Reséndez as Fausto Buenrostro
 Manuel "Flaco" Ibáñez as Dr. Lefort
 Karla Álvarez as Regina
 Norma Herrera as Alicia Rosales
 Macaria as Isabel López
 Xavier Ortiz as Lalo Mora
 Mike Biagio as Cristián Bermudez
 Ricardo Margaleff as Arnoldo Klunder
 Martha Ofelia Galindo as Bruja Bartola
 Jorge De Silva as El Lobo
 Luis Uribe as Jairo
 Jaime Lozano as Jimmy

Recurring

 Ricardo Abarca as Aldo Hernández / Aldo Sermeño Lerdo de Tejada
 Felipe Sánchez as Iván García
 Renata Notni as Luisa Hernández / Luisa Sermeño Lerdo de Tejada
 Nicole Casteele as Daniela "Danny" Hernández / Daniela "Danny" Sermeño Lerdo de Tejada
 Lucia Zerecero as Katia Lerdo de Tejada Moncada
 Aldo Gallardo as Hector

Guest stars
Mariana Juárez as herself
Ana María Torres as herself
Cibernético as himself

Production
Production officially began on July 28, 2008. To prepare for her role, Danna García received advice from several boxers like Jesús Martínez, Mariana Juárez and Ana María Torres.

Awards and nominations

References

External links

 at esmas.com 

2008 telenovelas
Mexican telenovelas
2008 Mexican television series debuts
2009 Mexican television series endings
Television shows set in Mexico
Televisa telenovelas
Mexican television series based on Argentine television series
Spanish-language telenovelas